Is Harry on the Boat? Is a 2001 British made-for-TV film, based on the lives of holiday reps in Ibiza. A television drama series then followed, airing on Sky One from 2002 to 2003.

Background
It is based on the book of the same name by Colin Butts. The title is a reference to the sexual act of ejaculating on the face ('Harry Monk', often shortened just to 'Harry', is Cockney rhyming slang for "spunk" (a British slang term for semen) and 'boat race', or just 'boat', is rhyming slang for 'face').

The TV series was developed and produced by Rapido TV for Sky TV. "Is Harry on the Boat?" was a mix of fast-paced drama, sex and comedy. It was set in Ibiza and focused on the adventures of a group of holiday reps catering for an 18-30 market.

Cast
The cast of the film was made up from a series of young, mainly unknown young actors and gave first TV appearances to a number of now notable British actors.

 Danny Dyer as Brad
 Rik Young as Mario
 Des Coleman as Mikey
 Davinia Taylor as Alison
 Will Mellor as Greg
 Kate Magowan as Carmen
 Daniela Denby-Ashe as Lorraine
 Keith Allen as Trevor
 David Girvan as Russell
 Ralf Little as Nick
 Caroline Flack as Blonde
 Stuart Sinclair Blyth as Jim
 Kate Sanderson as Belinda
 Jakki Degg as Claire
 Jack Rossi as wee Jack
 Leanne Wilson as Trudy
 Steve Chaplin as Pitbull
 Susan McArdle as Pacemaker Peggy
 Jonathon Natynczyk as Trannie 1
 Rebecca Hazlewood as Girl with Brad
 John Simm as Prize Winner

Television series
The TV series cast was totally different from the movie cast, with no actors from the movie appearing in the TV series. The TV series ran for 2 series with 18 episodes in series 1 and 10 in series 2. Although like the film being set in Ibiza the series was filmed in Almunecar in Southern Spain

Main Cast Series 1
 James Doherty as Brian Simms
 Steve North as Cosmic Bob
 Charlie Kemp as Robbie Cooper
 Lorna Pegler as Rosie Chadderton
 Gregory Finnegan as Gabriel Brennan
 Louise Franklin as Donna Harrison
 Quentin Jones as Garry Flemming
 Pooja Shah as Sinjata Kapoor

See also
 Club 18-30

External links
 
 

Sky UK original programming
British television films
2001 television films
2001 films
2002 British television series debuts
2003 British television series endings
2000s British drama television series
Films directed by Menhaj Huda